National Secondary Route 118, or just Route 118 (or ) is a National Road Route of Costa Rica, located in the Alajuela province.

Description
In Alajuela province the route covers Alajuela canton (San José, Tambor districts), Grecia canton (Grecia, San Roque, Tacares, Puente de Piedra, Bolívar districts), Naranjo canton (Naranjo district), Poás canton (Carrillos district), Sarchí canton (Sarchí Norte, Sarchí Sur, San Pedro districts).

References

Highways in Costa Rica